The "potato riots" were the mass anti-serfdom movement of udelnye krestyane (imperial peasants; peasants in the personal property lands of the Russian imperial house) in 1834, and of state peasants in 1840–44, in Russian Empire. The reason for the rebellion was the coercive introduction  of potato cultivation. The government selected the best fertile sections for potatoes from peasant lands. Authorities enforced brutal punishments for the non-fulfillment of the orders and assessed different requisitions. In 1834 unrest flared up in Vyatsky and Vladimir provinces, but it reached its height among the state peasants in 1840–44. Riots appeared simultaneously and they were partly in response to Pavel Kiselyov's reforms of state villages (1837–41). In the provinces of Ural and the lower Volga Region more than 500,000 peasants rose up destroying sowings of potatoes, and thrashing officials. They arbitrarily re-elected wardens, and attacked punitive detachments with weapons. Aside from ethnic Russians, participants in the riots included the Mari population, Chuvashes, Udmurts, Tatars, and Komi. The government sent troops to suppress the riots. In a number of places, peasants were shot. Thousands of rebels were convicted, and exiled into Siberia or forcibly drafted as soldiers.

The eschatological rumours associating potato planting with the service to the Antichrist has also contributed to the magnitude of the disturbances.

See also
 List of food riots

References

Tokarev SV, peasant revolts, potato, Kirov, 1939; 
Druzhinin, NM, State peasants and reform PD Kiselev, V. 2, Moscow, 1958, pp. 456–524; 
Peasant Movement in Russia in 1826–1849 years. Sat Doc-Tov, M., 1961. 248-55, 407-524.

Food riots
1834 riots
1840s riots
1840 riots
1841 riots
1842 riots
1843 riots
1844 riots
History of the potato
Riots and civil disorder in Russia
1840s in the Russian Empire 
1834 in the Russian Empire 
1840 in the Russian Empire
1841 in the Russian Empire
1842 in the Russian Empire 
1843 in the Russian Empire